Timeline of the COVID-19 pandemic in the Republic of Ireland may refer to:

 Timeline of the COVID-19 pandemic in the Republic of Ireland (2020)
 Timeline of the COVID-19 pandemic in the Republic of Ireland (2021)
 Timeline of the COVID-19 pandemic in the Republic of Ireland (2022)

Ireland